"Drowning" is a song co-written and recorded by American country music singer Chris Young. It was released on September 23, 2019, as the second single from Young's seventh studio album Famous Friends. Young wrote and produced the song with Corey Crowder, with additional writing from Josh Hoge.

Background
Young wrote the song in tribute to one of his friends, Adam, who died in a car crash.

Music video
The music video, directed by Jeff Johnson, was released on September 24, 2019. Young holds his late friend Adam's picture at first, before the video cuts to scenes from the Raised On Country World Tour 2019, held in Richmond, Virginia. Other people are also shown holding pictures of deceased family members.

Commercial performance
As of January 2020, the song has sold 78,000 copies in the US.

The song reached No. 18 on the Hot Country Songs chart in 2019 and No. 25 on Country Airplay in 2020, becoming Young's first single to miss the top 20 on the latter chart since "Neon" in 2012.

Charts

Weekly charts

Year-end charts

Certifications

References

2019 singles
2019 songs
Chris Young (musician) songs
Songs written by Corey Crowder (songwriter)
Songs written by Josh Hoge
Songs written by Chris Young (musician)
Sony Music singles